Mozelos is a Portuguese town and a parish, located in the  city of Santa Maria da Feira. The population in 2011 was 7,142, in an area of 5.81 km2. Its zip code is 4535.

Mozelos is located 8 km from the city of Espinho and around 20 km from Porto. The district capital Aveiro is approximately 50 km from the town.

In 1097, the village was known as Moazellus. They still have a Roman road nearby the church. It declared itself a town on June 24, 1989, and it celebrates the transition to a town every June 24. It is the place where Américo Amorim lived for some years.

References

Freguesias of Santa Maria da Feira
Towns in Portugal